Peter van der Merwe may refer to:

 Peter van der Merwe (cricketer) (1937–2013), South African cricketer
 Peter van der Merwe (musicologist), South African musicologist

See also 
 Peter van de Merwe (1942–2016), Dutch footballer
 Pieter van der Merwe, British maritime historian